February 11 - Eastern Orthodox liturgical calendar - February 13

All fixed commemorations below are observed on February 25 by Eastern Orthodox Churches on the Old Calendar.

For February 12th, Orthodox Churches on the Old Calendar commemorate the Saints listed on January 30.

Saints

 Holy martyrs Prima, Ampelius, Dativus, Plotinus, Saturninus, Fabius, Felix and their companions, in Carthage, by the sword (304)  (see also: February 11 - West )
 Saint Meletius of Antioch, Archbishop of Antioch (381)
 Saint Saint Mary (Marinus) at Alexandria, nun, and her father Eugene, monk, of Alexandria  (6th century)
 Saint Antony II of Constantinople, Patriarch (901)
 Saint Sisinnios, 'Bishop of God', in the region of the Metropolis of Ephesus (c. 919-944)

Pre-Schism Western saints

 Martyrs Modestus and Julian, at Carthage (2nd century?)
 Hieromartyr Urbanus, Pope of Rome (223-230) (see also: May 25)
 Saint Modestus, a deacon, born in Sardinia and martyred under Diocletian (c. 304)
 Saint Eulalia of Barcelona (Aulaire, Aulazie, Olalla), born in Barcelona in Spain, she was a virgin-martyr under Diocletian (c. 304) (see also: August 22 and December 10)
 Saint Damian, a martyr in Rome whose relics were found in the Catacombs of St Callistus and sent to Salamanca in Spain
 Saint Gaudentius of Verona, Bishop of Verona in Italy, Confessor (c. 465)
 Saint Æthelwold of Lindisfarne (740)
 Saint Benedict Revelli, a monk at Santa Maria dei Fonti in Italy, then a hermit on the island of Gallinaria in the Gulf of Genoa, became Bishop of Albenga in 870 (c. 900)
 Saint Julian the Hospitaller

Post-Schism Orthodox saints

 Saint Prochorus of Georgia, builder of Holy Cross Monastery near Jerusalem (1066)
 Venebrable hieromartyr John the Sinaite (1091)
 New Monk-martyrs Luke (Mukhaidze) (1277) and Nicholas (Dvali) (1314), of Jerusalem, and the holy fathers of the Georgian monasteries in Jerusalem
 Saint Alexius, Metropolitan and Wonderworker of all Russia (1378)
 Saint Bassian, founder and Abbot of Ryabovsky Forest Monastery in Uglich (1509)
 New Martyr Christos the Gardener, at Constantinople (1748)
 Saint Meletius, Archbishop of Kharkov (1840)
 Venerable Meletios of Ypseni (Meletios of Lardos), founder of the Monastery of Panagia Ypseni, Rhodes, in 1855 (19th century)

New martyrs and confessors

 New Hieromartyr Alexius (Buy), Bishop of Voronezh (1930) (see also: October 21)
 New Martyr Mitrophan, Archpriest (1931)

Other commemorations

 Appearance of the Iveron Icon of the Most Holy Theotokos ("Panagia Portaitissa" or "Gate-Keeper"), Mt. Athos (9th century)  (see also: March 31)
 Consecration of the Church of the Theotokos in Pousgin (1002)
 Repose of the cave-dweller Anastasia (Logacheva) of Ardatov (1875)

Icon gallery

Notes

References

Sources
 February 12 / 25. Orthodox Calendar (Pravoslavie.ru).
 February 25 / 12. Holy Trinity Russian Orthodox Church (A parish of the Patriarchate of Moscow).
 February 12. OCA - The Lives of the Saints.
 The Autonomous Orthodox Metropolia of Western Europe and the Americas. St. Hilarion Calendar of Saints for the year of our Lord 2004. St. Hilarion Press (Austin, TX). p. 14.
 The Twelfth Day of the Month of February. Orthodoxy in China.
 February 12. Latin Saints of the Orthodox Patriarchate of Rome.
 The Roman Martyrology. Transl. by the Archbishop of Baltimore. Last Edition, According to the Copy Printed at Rome in 1914. Revised Edition, with the Imprimatur of His Eminence Cardinal Gibbons. Baltimore: John Murphy Company, 1916. pp. 45–46.
 Rev. Richard Stanton. A Menology of England and Wales, or, Brief Memorials of the Ancient British and English Saints Arranged According to the Calendar, Together with the Martyrs of the 16th and 17th Centuries. London: Burns & Oates, 1892. pp. 63–66.
Greek Sources
 Great Synaxaristes:  12 Φεβρουαριου. Μεγασ Συναξαριστησ.
  Συναξαριστής. 12 Φεβρουαρίου. Ecclesia.gr. (H Εκκλησια Τησ Ελλαδοσ).
Russian Sources
  25 февраля (12 февраля). Православная Энциклопедия под редакцией Патриарха Московского и всея Руси Кирилла (электронная версия). (Orthodox Encyclopedia - Pravenc.ru).

February in the Eastern Orthodox calendar